Balakote (also known as Bala Kote) is a village and tehsil in Poonch district of the Indian union territory of Jammu and Kashmir.

Demographics
According to the 2011 census of India, Balnoi has 103 households. The literacy rate of Balakote was 79.89% compared to 67.16% of Jammu and Kashmir. In Balakote, Male literacy stands at 91.77% while the female literacy rate was 71.16%.

Transportation

Road
Balakote is well-connected by road to other places in Jammu and Kashmir and India by the NH 144A and BG Surankote Road.

Rail

Air

See also
Jammu and Kashmir
Poonch district
Poonch

References

Villages in Balakote tehsil